Leiocephalus melanochlorus, commonly known as the Tiburon curlytail or Jeremie curlytail lizard, is a species of lizard in the family Leiocephalidae (curly-tailed lizard). It is native to Haiti.

References

Leiocephalus
Reptiles described in 1863
Reptiles of Haiti
Taxa named by Edward Drinker Cope